Southern Islands  Constituency was a constituency in Singapore. It used to exist from 1955 to 1968. It includes Sentosa, Pulau Brani, Kusu Island and St John's Island. In lieu of reducing population, it was divided into mainly mainland wards in Jurong, Pasir Panjang and Telok Blangah.

Member of Parliament

Elections

Elections in 1950s

Elections in the 1960s

Historical maps

References 

Singaporean electoral divisions
Southern Islands